The women's shot put at the 2022 World Athletics U20 Championships was held at the Estadio Olímpico Pascual Guerrero on 1 and 2 August.

24 athletes from 18 countries were originally entered to the competition. Since only two athletes per member nation can compete in each event, the third shot putter entered by the United States, Sarah Marvin, was unable to compete reducing the athletes to 23.

Records
U20 standing records prior to the 2022 World Athletics U20 Championships were as follows:

Results

Qualification
The qualification round took place on 15 July, in two groups, both starting at 9:40. Athletes attaining a qualifying mark of 15.70 metres ( Q ) or at least the 12 best performers ( q ) advanced to final. The overall results were as follows:

Final
The final was started at 15:16 on 2 August.

References

Shot put
Shot put at the World Athletics U20 Championships